The Patek Philippe Calibre 89 is a commemorative pocket watch created in 1989, to celebrate the company's 150th anniversary.  Declared by Patek Philippe as "the most complicated watch in the world" at the time of creation, it has 33 complications, weighs 1.1 kg, exhibits 24 hands and has 1,728 components in total, including a thermometer, and a star chart.  Before Calibre 89, Patek Philippe Henry Graves Supercomplication (created in 1933) had been the world’s most complicated timepiece ever assembled with a total of 24 different functions.    

Patek Philippe Calibre 89 was made from 18 carat (75%) gold or
platinum, with an estimated value of $6 million. It took five years of research and development, and four years to manufacture. Four watches were made: one in white gold, one in yellow gold, one in rose gold and one in platinum. The yellow-gold and the white-gold Calibre 89 were sold at auction by Antiquorum in 2009 and 2004, respectively, and both watches currently rank among the top 10 most expensive watches ever sold at auction, with final prices over 5 million US dollars. The one in yellow gold was later offered at Sotheby’s in 2017, but remained unsold due to disappointing biddings, less than $6.4 million, excluding buyer's premium.  

Approximately 27 years later, on 17 September 2015, Vacheron Constantin introduced the Reference 57260 which took over the title of 'most complicated watch in the world' with a total of 57 complications.

Complications (features)
 Grand sonnerie
 Petite sonnerie
 Trip minute repeater (westminster on 4 gongs)
 Alarm
 Day of the month
 12-hour recorder
 Day of the week
 Hour of second time zone
 Moon phase display
 Winding crown position indicator
 Century decade and year displays
 Leap year indicator
 Power reserve
 Month
 Thermometer
 Date of Easter
 Time of sunrise
 Equation of time
 Star chart
 Sun hand
 Time of sunset
 Split second hand

Specifications
 Total diameter     89 mm
 Total thickness    41 mm
 Total weight     1100 grams

See also
The Vacheron Constantin Reference 57260
Patek Philippe Henry Graves Supercomplication

References

External links
The Patek Philippe Museum
The 9 Most Important Watches in the World John Biggs,  Popular Mechanics

Watch models
Individual watches